The Dakar-Port Sudan Railway is a 4,000 km long proposal put forward during 2008 to 2010 to link Dakar, Senegal with Port Sudan, Sudan by a transcontinental railway.  It would pass through several countries along the way and would have branches to link capital cities not on the direct route.

Route 
It was hoped that the initial line would develop into a railway network that would cover the whole of Africa.  By comparison, except for the extreme south and extreme north of Africa, railways are fragmentary, and hampered by differences in track gauge.

It would go through the following countries:
  Senegal 
  Mali
  Niger
  Chad
  Sudan

There is already a metre gauge (Dakar–Niger Railway) from Dakar to Koulikoro, Mali, as well as a  gauge railway connecting Port Sudan to Nyala, Sudan near the border with Chad.

See also 
 AfricaRail

References 

International railway lines
Rail transport in Senegal
Rail transport in Mali
Rail transport in Niger
Rail transport in Sudan
Rail transport in Chad
Proposed transport infrastructure in Senegal
Proposed transport infrastructure in Mali
Proposed transport infrastructure in Niger
Proposed transport infrastructure in Sudanl
Proposed transport infrastructure in Chad